Phyllorachideae is a tribe in the grass family, comprising two genera. It may be better placed as a subtribe of Oryzeae.

References

Poaceae tribes
Oryzoideae